Savica Mrkić (born 26 September 1991) is a Macedonian handball player for Italian handball team AC Life Style Erice and the Macedonian national team.

References

1991 births
Living people
Macedonian female handball players
Macedonian people of Serbian descent